= Houcine Arfa affair =

Controversy involving Madagascar and France

The Houcine Arfa affair is a controversy involving Madagascar and France.

Houcine Arfa is a French former boxer and soldier who worked as a security advisor for the government of Madagascar. He was subsequently arrested and sentenced in 2017 for attempted kidnapping, holding illegal arms, corruption and abuse of power. However, in late 2017, he escaped from prison and fled to France, where he claimed he had been a political prisoner and had been abused in prison.
